Dvorskoye is a rural locality (a selo) in Nemetsky National District, Altai Krai, Russia. The population was 149 as of 2013.

Geography 
Dvorskoye is located 26 km northeast of Galbshtadt (the district's administrative centre) by road. Orlovo is the nearest rural locality.

References 

Rural localities in Nemetsky National District